This is a comparison of the IOC, FIFA, and ISO 3166-1 three-letter codes, combined into one table for easy reference. Highlighted rows indicate those entries in which the three-letter codes differ from column to column.  The last column indicates the number of codes present followed by letters to indicate which codes are present (O for Olympic, F for FIFA, and I for ISO) and dashes when a code is absent; capital letters indicate codes which match; lower case letters indicate codes which differ.

Ambiguities 
Currently, the only ambiguous trigraph between IOC, FIFA and ISO codes is:
 BRN - IOC code for Bahrain and ISO code for Brunei

Historically, ambiguous trigraphs include:
 ANT - IOC code for Antigua and Barbuda, and historical ISO and FIFA code for the Netherlands Antilles (until 2010)
 BUR - IOC code for Burkina Faso (since 1984), and historical ISO and FIFA code for Burma (until 1989)

In the following cases, a code for a historical country or territory matches a modern code of the country it merged into:
 KHM - ISO code for Cambodia and historical IOC code for the Khmer Republic
 VNM - historical IOC and ISO code for South Vietnam, became the ISO code for unified Vietnam
 WSM - ISO code for Samoa and historical IOC code for Western Samoa
 YEM - historical ISO code for the North Yemen, became the generally accepted code for unified Yemen

Including other lists of country three-letter-codes increases the number of ambiguities. For example: 
 AUS - IOC, FIFA and ISO code for Australia, but UNDP code for Austria (Australia is AUL there)

List
This list only includes nations or territories that have been assigned at least one of these three types of country codes. For a more complete list of countries, see list of countries.

Former countries and former country names 
Codes are shown with their last year of use.

See also
 List of IOC country codes

Notes 

Country codes
Alphabetic country codes